Craigville Beach is located on Nantucket Sound. 

It is located in Craigville  (part of Centerville, Massachusetts) and is a very popular tourist hot spot on Cape Cod.  Unlike many private Cape beaches which offer parking to residents only, Craigville is a public beach area, available to non-residents for a daily parking fee. In the summer, kite surfing is extremely popular.

Craigville beach consists of two separate beaches. The public beach, Craigville Beach and the resident beach, Covell's Beach. 

It is divided by Craigville Beach Association then merges into Covell's Beach.

References

Barnstable, Massachusetts
Beaches of Massachusetts
Landforms of Barnstable County, Massachusetts
Tourist attractions in Barnstable County, Massachusetts